Phillip W. Cohan (November 14, 1910–March 21, 2000) was an American producer and director.

Cohan started out as an employee for Paramount Pictures. From there he went to radio and then to television. He was most famous for his involvement in the short film A Rhapsody in Black and Blue and as the creator, producer and director of The Durante-Moore Show starring Jimmy Durante and Garry Moore.

Personal life

Cohan was born in 1910 in Alabama, the only child of Phil and Laura Cohan. He graduated from the University of Pennsylvania. He was married once to Rae Hollander and had two sons; Robert and Ralph. He died on March 21, 2000 in Westlake, Ohio at the age of 89. Cohan is buried in Holy Cross Cemetery in Brook Park, Ohio.

References

1910 births
2000 deaths
People from Meriden, Connecticut